Drowning detection systems are video monitoring or camera systems designed to improve safety by reducing drowning deaths  and injuries in public and private pools, waterparks, thermal baths, or spa facilities.

Classification
Pool monitoring systems fall into two broad categories: Passive or Active. Passive systems provide lifeguards with views of swimmer activity and behaviour below the water surface, which aids the 10:20 scan for identifying potential incidents. They offer a way of compensating for surface glare and blind spots in the swimming pool, thereby making the lifeguard's job easier.
Active systems are designed to automatically monitor the pool and alert lifeguards to potential incidents.

Passive systems 
Passive system underwater cameras let lifeguards inspect multiple underwater views simultaneously from a single location. Cameras can cover areas which may otherwise be obstructed. Below water cameras can be paired with above water cameras to provide face-to-body matching if there is an incident where a swimmer needs to be identified, in cases of sexual assault for example.

References

Swimming pool equipment
Cameras by type
Safety equipment